Built With Hate is an album by the band Scraper, released on Household Name Records on August 5, 1996. The first 500 were released on 10" blue vinyl.

Track listing

Side one
Backbreaker
Thicker Than Mud
Seven Years
Reach For The Bar
Spitting Teeth
Nut Roast

Side two
Inside Out
Nothing Left Alive
Zulu
Leave It
Anxiety

Credits
Tracks 1-6 Recorded on Digital 24 track at Workshop Studios, Redditch, UK, March 1996. Track 7 Recorded on 8 track at DeHavilland Studios, Tamworth, UK, April 1995. Tracks 8-11 Recorded on 24 track digital at Workshop Studios, Redditch, UK, July 1995.

1996 albums